Menominee River State Recreation Area is a state-managed protected area located in Breitung and Norway townships in Dickinson County and Faithorn Township in Menominee County, Michigan, southeast of Iron Mountain. The park comprises a  tract along  of the Menominee River south of the City of Norway and the  Quiver Falls Tract along  of the river farther downstream. In 2016, an additional  of Escanaba State Forest land was transferred from the Forestry Division to the DNR's Parks and Recreation Division and became the Pemene Falls Unit of the park, matching a similarly-named unit on the Wisconsin side of the river.

According to the Michigan Department of Natural Resources (DNR), the Piers Gorge tract includes "whitewater rapids and waterfalls, and contains some of the fastest-moving water in Michigan or Wisconsin. It is not navigable for general canoeing, but has become a popular destination for expert class kayakers seeking challenging Class IV whitewater. The parcel also contains good wildlife viewing opportunities for eagles, osprey and waterfowl, as well as public fishing access." The DNR notes the Quiver Falls parcel as containing "river frontage on both sides of the Menominee River, scenic rocky gorges with significant drops in the river and waterfalls. The area is popular with hunters and anglers, as well visitors because of the scenic sightseeing opportunities."

The lands on the Wisconsin side of the river are part of the Menominee River State Park and Recreation Area and managed by the Wisconsin Department of Natural Resources. Both parks are managed together by the departments of both states.

History
The total purchase price for the acreage on the Michigan side of the river was $2,534,400 and was funded from the Michigan Natural Resources Trust Fund and DNR Land Exchange Facilitation Fund.

References

External links
 Parks and Recreation Land Acquisition and Boundary Dedication Michigan Department of Natural Resources
 Menominee River State Recreation Area map Wisconsin Department of Natural Resources
 Menominee River State Park and Recreation Area Wisconsin Department of Natural Resources

Protected areas of Dickinson County, Michigan
Protected areas of Menominee County, Michigan
State recreation areas of Michigan
2011 establishments in Michigan
Parks established in 2011